Take It Off! is an EP by noise rock band The Honeymoon Killers, released in 1988 by Buy Our Records.

Track listing

Personnel 
Adapted from the Take It Off! liner notes.

The Honeymoon Killers
 Sally Edroso – drums
 Jerry Teel –electric guitar, vocals, cover art, illustrations
 Lisa Wells – bass guitar

Production and additional personnel
 Chris Gehringer – mastering
 The Honeymoon Killers – production
 Michael Lavine – photography
 Wharton Tiers – engineering

Release history

References

External links 
 

1988 EPs
The Honeymoon Killers (American band) albums
Albums produced by Wharton Tiers